Subhash Barala (born 5 December 1967) is the leader of Bharatiya Janata Party in Haryana. He is the former president of state unit of the party from (2014-2020) and former member of Haryana Legislative Assembly from Tohana in Fatehabad district.

He lost the Tohana Assembly seat to Jananayak Janata Party candidate, Devender Singh Babli in the Haryana Legislative Assembly 2019 Elections. Devender Singh Babli defeated Subhash Barala by a margin of 52,302 votes which was the second worst defeat faced by any candidate in the state.

Personal life
Barala was born in Dangra village in Tohana tehsil. He completed a diploma in Civil Engineering from HMS Polytechnic in Bengaluru.

References

Haryana MLAs 2014–2019
Living people
People from Fatehabad district
Bharatiya Janata Party politicians from Haryana
1967 births